Tulpehocken may refer to:

In New Jersey:
Tulpehocken Creek (New Jersey), a tributary of the Wading River

In Pennsylvania:
Tulpehocken Creek (Pennsylvania), a tributary of the Schuylkill River
Tulpehocken station, a commuter rail station in the Northwest section of Philadelphia
Tulpehocken Manor Plantation, historic farm in Myerstown
Tulpehocken Station Historic District, Philadelphia
Tulpehocken Township, Pennsylvania, a township in Berks County
Upper Tulpehocken Township, Pennsylvania, a township in Berks County

See also